Hurenko, Hurenka, also transliterated Gurenko, is a surname. Notable people with the surname include:

 Artem Gurenko (born 1994), Belarusian footballer
 Sergei Gurenko (born 1972), Belarusian football coach
 Stanislav Hurenko (1936–2013), Soviet-Ukrainian politician

See also
 

Ukrainian-language surnames